Jeffrey Lewis, known as Jeff Lewis, is an American screenwriter, best known for his work with Hill Street Blues. He earned 8 Emmy Award nominations as a writer and one win as well as 8 Writers Guild of America Award nominations, including 1 win as a writer, all for Hill Street Blues. He was a Yale University roommate with David Milch and recruited him to join Hill Street Blues staff.

Awards
The following is an award summary for Lewis.
Primetime Emmy Award (All for Outstanding Writing for a Drama Series)

Also credited for Primetime Emmy Award for Outstanding Drama Series nominations in 1984, 1985, 1986, with 1984 being a win.

Humanitas Prize for 60 Minute Network or Syndicated Television
1985 Ceremony (11th annual):  Hill Street Blues - Teleplay by David Milch & Roger Director Story by Steven Bochco, Jeffrey Lewis, David Milch for "Watt a Way to Go" - Nominee

Writers Guild of America Award (all Best Screenplay – Episodic Drama)

1982:  Hill Street Blues - Jeffrey Lewis for "Fruits of the Poisonous Tree" - Nominee
1983:  Hill Street Blues - Teleplay by Anthony Yerkovich, David Milch, Karen Hall Story by Steven Bochco, Anthony Yerkovich, Jeffrey Lewis for "Eugene's Comedy Empire Strikes Back" - Nominee
1983:  Hill Street Blues - David Milch, Jeffrey Lewis, Michael Wagner for "Gung Ho!" - Nominee
'1984: Hill Street Blues - Teleplay by Jeffrey Lewis, Michael Wagner, Karen Hall, Mark Frost Story by Steven Bochco, Jeffrey Lewis, David Milch for "Grace Under Pressure"
1984: Hill Street Blues - Teleplay by Jeffrey Lewis, Michael Wagner, David Milch, Mark Frost Story by Steven Bochco, Jeffrey Lewis, David Milch for "Parting Is Such Sweep Sorrow" - Nominee
1985:  Hill Street Blues - Teleplay by David Milch & Roger Director Story by Steven Bochco, Jeffrey Lewis, David Milch for "Watt a Way to Go" - Nominee
1986:  Hill Street Blues - Teleplay by Walon Green Story by Jeffrey Lewis, David Milch, Walon Green for "Remembrance of Hits Past" - Nominee
1987:  Hill Street Blues'' - Teleplay by Jeffrey Lewis Story by Jeffrey Lewis & Jerry Patrick Brown for "Fathers and Guns" - Nominee

Notes

External links

American television producers
American television writers
American male television writers
Emmy Award winners
Living people
Yale University alumni
Place of birth missing (living people)
Year of birth missing (living people)